This is a list of the mammal species recorded in Russia. There are 266 mammal species in Russia, of which five are critically endangered, thirteen are endangered, twenty-six are vulnerable, and six are near threatened. One of the species listed for Russia is extinct and one can no longer be found in the wild. All the mammals of Russia are in the subclass Theria and infraclass Eutheria, being all placental.

The following tags are used to highlight each species' conservation status as assessed by the International Union for Conservation of Nature:

Order: Sirenia (manatees and dugongs)

Sirenia is an order of fully aquatic, herbivorous mammals that inhabit rivers, estuaries, coastal marine waters, swamps, and marine wetlands. All four species are endangered.
Family: Dugongidae
Genus: Hydrodamalis
Steller's sea cow, H. gigas

Order: Rodentia (rodents)

Rodents make up the largest order of mammals, with over 40% of mammalian species. They have two incisors in the upper and lower jaw which grow continually and must be kept short by gnawing.
Suborder: Sciurognathi
Family: Castoridae (beavers)
Genus: Castor
North American beaver, C. canadensis  introduced
Eurasian beaver, C. fiber 
Family: Sciuridae (squirrels)
Subfamily: Sciurinae
Tribe: Sciurini
Genus: Sciurus
Red squirrel, S. vulgaris 
Tribe: Pteromyini
Genus: Pteromys
 Siberian flying squirrel, P. volans 
Subfamily: Xerinae
Tribe: Marmotini
Genus: Marmota
 Gray marmot, M. baibacina 
 Bobak marmot, Marmota bobak
 Black-capped marmot, Marmota camtschatica
 Forest-steppe marmot, Marmota kastschenkoi 
 Tarbagan marmot, Marmota sibirica
Genus: Spermophilus
 Daurian ground squirrel, Spermophilus dauricus
 Red-cheeked ground squirrel, Spermophilus erythrogenys
 Russet ground squirrel, Spermophilus major
 Little ground squirrel, Spermophilus pygmaeus
 Speckled ground squirrel, Spermophilus suslicus
 Long-tailed ground squirrel, Spermophilus undulatus
Genus: Eutamias
 Siberian chipmunk, E. sibiricus 
Family: Gliridae (dormice)
Subfamily: Leithiinae
Genus: Dryomys
 Forest dormouse, Dryomys nitedula
Genus: Muscardinus
 Hazel dormouse, Muscardinus avellanarius
Subfamily: Glirinae
Genus: Glis
 European edible dormouse, Glis glis
Family: Dipodidae (jerboas)
Subfamily: Allactaginae
Genus: Allactaga
 Small five-toed jerboa, Allactaga elater
 Great jerboa, Allactaga major
Genus: Pygeretmus
 Dwarf fat-tailed jerboa, Pygeretmus pumilio
Subfamily: Cardiocraniinae
Genus: Salpingotus
 Heptner's pygmy jerboa, Salpingotus heptneri
Subfamily: Dipodinae
Genus: Dipus
 Northern three-toed jerboa, Dipus sagitta
Genus: Stylodipus
 Thick-tailed three-toed jerboa, Stylodipus telum
Subfamily: Sicistinae
Genus: Sicista
 Northern birch mouse, Sicista betulina
 Caucasian birch mouse, Sicista caucasica
 Long-tailed birch mouse, Sicista caudata 
 Kazbeg birch mouse, Sicista kazbegica 
 Kluchor birch mouse, Sicista kluchorica 
 Altai birch mouse, Sicista napaea
 Severtzov's birch mouse, Sicista severtzovi
 Strand's birch mouse, Sicista strandi
 Southern birch mouse, Sicista subtilis
Family: Spalacidae
Subfamily: Myospalacinae
Genus: Myospalax
 False zokor, Myospalax aspalax
 Transbaikal zokor, Myospalax epsilanus
 Siberian zokor, Myospalax myospalax
 Transbaikal zokor, Myospalax psilurus
Subfamily: Spalacinae
Genus: Spalax
 Russian mole rat, Spalax giganteus 
 Greater mole rat, Spalax microphthalmus 
Family: Cricetidae
Subfamily: Cricetinae
Genus: Cricetus
European hamster, C. cricetus 
Genus: Cricetulus
 Chinese striped hamster, Cricetulus barabensis
 Long-tailed dwarf hamster, Cricetulus longicaudatus
 Grey dwarf hamster, Cricetulus migratorius
Genus: Mesocricetus
 Ciscaucasian hamster, Mesocricetus raddei
Genus: Phodopus
 Campbell's dwarf hamster, Phodopus campbelli
 Roborovski hamster, Phodopus roborovskii
 Winter white Russian dwarf hamster, Phodopus sungorus
Genus: Tscherskia
 Greater long-tailed hamster, Tscherskia triton
Subfamily: Arvicolinae
Genus: Alticola
 Gobi Altai mountain vole, Alticola barakshin
 Lemming vole, Alticola lemminus
 Large-eared vole, Alticola macrotis
 Flat-headed vole, Alticola strelzowi
 Tuva silver vole, Alticola tuvinicus
Genus: Arvicola
European water vole, A. amphibius 
Genus: Chionomys
 Caucasian snow vole, Chionomys gud
 Robert's snow vole, Chionomys roberti
Genus: Clethrionomys
 Bank vole, Clethrionomys glareolus
 Grey red-backed vole, Clethrionomys rufocanus
 Northern red-backed vole, Clethrionomys rutilus
 Shikotan vole, Clethrionomys sikotanensis
Genus: Dicrostonyx
 Arctic lemming, Dicrostonyx torquatus
 Wrangel lemming, Dicrostonyx vinogradovi 
Genus: Lagurus
 Steppe lemming, Lagurus lagurus
Genus: Lasiopodomys
 Brandt's vole, Lasiopodomys brandtii
Genus: Lemmus
 Amur lemming, Lemmus amurensis
 Norway lemming, Lemmus lemmus
 Brown lemming, Lemmus sibiricus
Genus: Microtus
 Field vole, Microtus agrestis
 Common vole, Microtus arvalis
 Daghestan pine vole, Microtus daghestanicus 
 Evorsk vole, Microtus evoronensis 
 Reed vole, Microtus fortis
 Narrow-headed vole, Microtus gregalis
 North Siberian vole, Microtus hyperboreus
 Maximowicz's vole, Microtus maximowiczii
 Middendorf's vole, Microtus middendorffi
 Mongolian vole, Microtus mongolicus
 Muisk vole, Microtus mujanensis 
 Nasarov's vole, Microtus nasarovi
 Altai vole, Microtus obscurus
 Tundra vole, Microtus oeconomus 
 Southern vole, Microtus rossiaemeridionalis
 Sakhalin vole, Microtus sachalinensis
 European pine vole, Microtus subterraneus 
Genus: Myopus
 Wood lemming, Myopus schisticolor 
Family: Muridae (mice, rats, voles, gerbils, hamsters, etc.)
Subfamily: Gerbillinae
Genus: Meriones
 Mid-day jird, Meriones meridianus
 Tamarisk jird, Meriones tamariscinus
 Mongolian jird, Meriones unguiculatus
Subfamily: Murinae
Genus: Apodemus
 Striped field mouse, Apodemus agrarius
 Yellow-necked mouse, Apodemus flavicollis
 Yellow-breasted field mouse, Apodemus fulvipectus
 Korean field mouse, Apodemus peninsulae
 Black Sea field mouse, Apodemus ponticus
 Wood mouse, Apodemus sylvaticus 
 Ural field mouse, Apodemus uralensis
Genus: Micromys
 Eurasian harvest mouse, Micromys minutus
Genus: Rattus
Brown rat, R. norvegicus  introduced
Black rat, R. rattus

Order: Lagomorpha (lagomorphs)

The lagomorphs comprise two families, Leporidae (hares and rabbits), and Ochotonidae (pikas). Though they can resemble rodents, and were classified as a superfamily in that order until the early 20th century, they have since been considered a separate order. They differ from rodents in a number of physical characteristics, such as having four incisors in the upper jaw rather than two.
Family: Leporidae (rabbits, hares)
Genus: Lepus
European hare, L. europaeus 
Manchurian hare, L. mandshuricus 
Mountain hare, L. timidus 
Tolai hare, L. tolai 
Genus: Oryctolagus
European rabbit, O. cuniculus  introduced
Family: Ochotonidae (pikas)
Genus: Ochotona
 Alpine pika, O. alpina 
 Daurian pika, O.  dauurica
 Northern pika, O. hyperborea
 Pallas's pika, O. pallasi
 Steppe pika, O. pusilla

Order: Eulipotyphla (shrews, hedgehogs, gymnures, moles and solenodons)

Eulipotyphlans are insectivorous mammals. Shrews and solenodons resemble mice, hedgehogs carry spines, gymnures look more like large rats, while moles are stout-bodied burrowers.
Family: Erinaceidae (hedgehogs)
Subfamily: Erinaceinae
Genus: Erinaceus
 Amur hedgehog, Erinaceus amurensis
 Southern white-breasted hedgehog, Erinaceus concolor
 West European hedgehog, Erinaceus europaeus
Genus: Mesechinus
 Daurian hedgehog, Mesechinus dauuricus

Family: Soricidae (shrews)
Subfamily: Crocidurinae
Genus: Crocidura
 Gueldenstaedt's shrew, Crocidura gueldenstaedtii
 Ussuri white-toothed shrew, Crocidura lasiura
 Bicolored shrew, Crocidura leucodon
 Siberian shrew, Crocidura sibirica
Lesser white-toothed shrew, C. suaveolens 
Subfamily: Soricinae
Tribe: Nectogalini
Genus: Neomys
 Eurasian water shrew, Neomys fodiens
Tribe: Soricini
Genus: Sorex
 Common shrew, Sorex araneus
 Laxmann's shrew, Sorex caecutiens
 Kamchatka shrew, Sorex camtschatica
 Siberian large-toothed shrew, Sorex daphaenodon
 Slender shrew, Sorex gracillimus
 Taiga shrew, Sorex isodon
 Paramushir shrew, Sorex leucogaster VU
 Eurasian least shrew, Sorex minutissimus
 Eurasian pygmy shrew, Sorex minutus
 Ussuri shrew, Sorex mirabilis
 Portenko's shrew, Sorex portenkoi
 Radde's shrew, Sorex raddei
 Flat-skulled shrew, Sorex roboratus
 Caucasian shrew, Sorex satunini
 Tundra shrew, Sorex tundrensis
 Long-clawed shrew, Sorex unguiculatus
 Caucasian pygmy shrew, Sorex volnuchini
Family: Talpidae (moles)
Subfamily: Talpinae
Tribe: Desmanini
Genus: Desmana
 Russian desman, Desmana moschata VU
Tribe: Talpini
Genus: Mogera
 Large mole, Mogera robusta
Genus: Talpa
 Siberian mole, Talpa altaica
 Caucasian mole, Talpa caucasica
 European mole, Talpa europaea
 Levantine mole, Talpa levantis

Order: Chiroptera (bats)

The bats' most distinguishing feature is that their forelimbs are developed as wings, making them the only mammals capable of flight. Bat species account for about 20% of all mammals.
Family: Vespertilionidae
Subfamily: Myotinae
Genus: Myotis
 Sakhalin myotis, M. abei DD
Bechstein's bat, M. bechsteini 
Lesser mouse-eared bat, M. blythii 
 Far eastern myotis, M. bombinus LC
Brandt's bat, M. brandti 
Long-fingered bat, M. capaccinii 
Pond bat, M. dasycneme 
Daubenton's bat, M. daubentonii  
Geoffroy's bat, M. emarginatus 
 Fraternal myotis, Myotis frater LC
 Ikonnikov's bat, Myotis ikonnikovi LC
 Big-footed myotis, Myotis macrodactylus LC
Whiskered bat, M. mystacinus 
Natterer's bat, M. nattereri 
Subfamily: Vespertilioninae
Genus: Barbastella
Western barbastelle, B. barbastellus 
Genus: Eptesicus
 Gobi big brown bat, Eptesicus gobiensis LC
 Northern bat, Eptesicus nilssoni LC
 Serotine bat, Eptesicus serotinus LC
Genus: Nyctalus
 Birdlike noctule, Nyctalus aviator LC
Greater noctule bat, N. lasiopterus 
Lesser noctule, N. leisleri 
Common noctule, N. noctula 
Genus: Pipistrellus
Nathusius' pipistrelle, P. nathusii 
Genus: Plecotus
Brown long-eared bat, P. auritus 
Genus: Vespertilio
 Parti-coloured bat, Vespertilio murinus LC
 Asian parti-colored bat, Vespertilio superans LC
Subfamily: Murininae
Genus: Murina
 Greater tube-nosed bat, Murina leucogaster LC
 Ussuri tube-nosed bat, Murina ussuriensis EN
Subfamily: Miniopterinae
Genus: Miniopterus
Common bent-wing bat, M. schreibersii 
Family: Molossidae
Genus: Tadarida
European free-tailed bat, T. teniotis 
Family: Rhinolophidae
Subfamily: Rhinolophinae
Genus: Rhinolophus
Mediterranean horseshoe bat, R. euryale 
Greater horseshoe bat, R. ferrumequinum 
Lesser horseshoe bat, R. hipposideros 
Mehely's horseshoe bat, R. mehelyi

Order: Cetacea (whales)

The order Cetacea includes whales, dolphins and porpoises. They are the mammals most fully adapted to aquatic life with a spindle-shaped nearly hairless body, protected by a thick layer of blubber, and forelimbs and tail modified to provide propulsion underwater.
Suborder: Mysticeti
Family: Balaenidae
Genus: Balaena
 Bowhead whale, Balaena mysticetus
Genus: Eubalaena
 North Pacific right whale, Eubalaena japonica EN
Family: Balaenopteridae
Subfamily: Balaenopterinae
Genus: Balaenoptera
 Minke whale, Balaenoptera acutorostrata
 Sei whale, Balaenoptera borealis EN
 Blue whale, Balaenoptera musculus EN
 Fin whale, Balaenoptera physalus EN
Subfamily: Megapterinae
Genus: Megaptera
 Humpback whale, Megaptera novaeangliae VU
Family: Eschrichtiidae
Genus: Eschrichtius
 Gray whale, Eschrichtius robustus
Suborder: Odontoceti
Superfamily: Platanistoidea
Family: Physeteridae
Genus: Physeter
 Sperm whale, Physeter macrocephalus VU
Family: Kogiidae
Genus: Kogia
Pygmy sperm whale, K. breviceps 
 Dwarf sperm whale, K. sima
Family: Monodontidae
Genus: Monodon
 Narwhal, Monodon monoceros DD
Genus: Delphinapterus
 Beluga, Delphinapterus leucas VU
Family: Phocoenidae
Genus: Phocoena
 Harbour porpoise, Phocoena phocoena VU
Genus: Phocoenoides
 Dall's porpoise, Phocoenoides dalli
Family: Ziphidae
Genus: Ziphius
 Cuvier's beaked whale, Ziphius cavirostris DD
Genus: Berardius
 Giant beaked whale, Berardius bairdii
Subfamily: Hyperoodontinae
Genus: Hyperoodon
 Bottlenose whale, Hyperoodon ampullatus
Genus: Mesoplodon
 Stejneger's beaked whale, Mesoplodon stejnegeri DD
Family: Delphinidae (marine dolphins)
 Genus: Lagenorhynchus
 White-beaked dolphin, Lagenorhynchus albirostris LC
 Atlantic white-sided dolphin, Lagenorhynchus acutus LC
 Pacific white-sided dolphin, Lagenorhynchus obliquidens
Genus: Tursiops
 Bottlenose dolphin, Tursiops truncatus DD
Genus: Stenella
 Striped dolphin, Stenella coeruleoalba
Genus: Delphinus
 Short-beaked common dolphin, Delphinus delphis
Genus: Lissodelphis
 Northern right whale dolphin, Lissodelphis borealis
Genus: Grampus
 Risso's dolphin, Grampus griseus DD
Genus: Pseudorca
 False killer whale, Pseudorca crassidens
Genus: Orcinus
Orca, O. orca

Order: Carnivora (carnivorans)

There are over 260 species of carnivorans, the majority of which feed primarily on meat. They have a characteristic skull shape and dentition. 
Suborder: Feliformia
Family: Felidae (cats)
Subfamily: Felinae
Genus: Felis
 Jungle cat, F. chaus 
European wildcat, F. silvestris 
African wildcat, F. lybica 
Genus: Lynx
Eurasian lynx, L. lynx 
Genus Otocolobus
Pallas's cat, O. manul 
Genus: Prionailurus
Leopard cat, P. bengalensis 
Subfamily: Pantherinae
Genus: Panthera
Leopard, P. pardus 
 Amur leopard, P. p. orientalis 
 Persian leopard, P. p. tulliana 
Tiger, P. tigris 
 Siberian tiger, P. t. tigris 
Snow leopard, P. uncia 
Suborder: Caniformia
Family: Canidae (dogs, foxes)
Genus: Vulpes
Corsac fox, V. corsac 
Arctic fox, V. lagopus 
Red fox, V. vulpes 
Genus: Nyctereutes
Raccoon dog, N. procyonoides 
Genus: Canis
Golden jackal, C. aureus 
Gray wolf, C. lupus 
 Tundra wolf, C. l. albus
 Steppe wolf, C. l. campestris
 Mongolian wolf, C. l. chanco
 Eurasian wolf, C. l. lupus
Family: Ursidae (bears)
Genus: Ursus
Brown bear, U. arctos 
 Eurasian brown bear, U. a. arctos
 Kamchatka brown bear, U. a. beringianus
 East Siberian brown bear, U. a. arctos
 Ussuri brown bear, U. a. lasiotus
 Polar bear, U. maritimus 
Asiatic black bear, U. thibetanus 
 Ussuri black bear, U. t. ussuricus
Family: Mustelidae (mustelids)
Genus: Enhydra
 Sea otter, E. lutris 
Genus: Gulo
Wolverine, G. gulo 
Genus: Lutra
Eurasian otter, L. lutra 
Genus: Martes
Yellow-throated marten, M. flavigula 
European pine marten, M. martes 
Beech marten, M. foina 
Sable, M. zibellina 
Genus: Meles
Caucasian badger, M. canescens 
European badger, M. meles 
Asian badger, M. leucurus 
Genus: Mustela
Mountain weasel, M. altaica 
Stoat, M. erminea 
Steppe polecat, M. eversmannii 
 Japanese weasel, M. itatsi  introduced, possibly extirpated
European mink, M. lutreola 
Least weasel, M. nivalis 
European polecat, M. putorius 
Siberian weasel, M. sibirica 
Genus: Neogale
American mink, N. vison  introduced
Genus: Vormela
Marbled polecat, V. peregusna 
Family: Otariidae (eared seals, sealions)
Genus: Callorhinus
 Northern fur seal, C. ursinus 
Genus: Eumetopias
 Steller sea lion, E. jubatus 
Genus: Zalophus
 Japanese sea lion, Z. japonicus  vagrant
Family: Odobenidae
Genus: Odobenus
 Walrus, O. rosmarus 
Family: Phocidae (earless seals)
Genus: Cystophora
 Hooded seal, C. cristata 
Genus: Erignathus
 Bearded seal, E. barbatus 
Genus: Halichoerus
 Grey seal, H. grypus 
Genus: Histriophoca
 Ribbon seal, H. fasciata 
Genus: Pagophilus
 Harp seal, P. groenlandicus 
Genus: Phoca
 Spotted seal, P. largha 
 Common seal, P. vitulina 
Genus: Pusa
 Caspian seal, P. caspica 
 Ringed seal, P. hispida 
 Baikal seal, P. sibirica

Order: Perissodactyla (odd-toed ungulates)

The odd-toed ungulates are browsing and grazing mammals. They are usually large to very large, and have relatively simple stomachs and a large middle toe.

Family: Equidae (horses etc.)
Genus: Equus
 Wild horse, E. ferus  reintroduced
 Przewalski's horse, E. f. przewalskii  reintroduced
 Onager, E. hemionus 
 Mongolian wild ass, E. h. hemionus 
 Turkmenian kulan, E. h. kulan

Order: Artiodactyla (even-toed ungulates)

The even-toed ungulates are ungulates whose weight is borne about equally by the third and fourth toes, rather than mostly or entirely by the third as in perissodactyls. There are about 220 artiodactyl species, including many that are of great economic importance to humans.
Family: Suidae (pigs)
Subfamily: Suinae
Genus: Sus
Wild boar, S. scrofa 
Family: Moschidae
Genus: Moschus
 Siberian musk deer, M. moschiferus 
Family: Cervidae (deer)
Subfamily: Cervinae
Genus: Cervus
 Wapiti, C. canadensis 
 Red deer, C. elaphus 
 Sika deer, C. nippon 
 Manchurian sika deer, C. n. mantchuricus 
Genus: Dama
 European fallow deer, D. dama  introduced
Subfamily: Capreolinae
Genus: Alces
Moose, A. alces 
Genus: Capreolus
Roe deer, C. capreolus 
 Siberian roe deer, C. pygargus 
Genus: Rangifer
 Reindeer, R. tarandus 
Family: Bovidae (cattle, antelope, sheep, goats)
Subfamily: Antilopinae
Genus: Procapra
 Mongolian gazelle, P. gutturosa 
Genus: Saiga
Saiga antelope, S. tatarica 
Subfamily: Bovinae 
Genus: Bos
Wild yak, B. mutus  extirpated
Genus: Bison
American bison, B. bison  introduced
Wood bison, B. b. athabascae introduced
European bison, B. bonasus  reintroduced
Subfamily: Caprinae
Genus: Capra
Wild goat, C. aegagrus 
West Caucasian tur, C. caucasica 
East Caucasian tur, C. cylindricornis 
Siberian ibex, C. sibrica 
Genus: Nemorhaedus
Chinese goral, N. caudatus 
Genus: Ovibos
 Muskox, O. moschatus 
Genus: Ovis
Argali, O. ammon 
 Snow sheep, O. nivicola 
Genus: Rupicapra
Chamois, R. rupicapra

Locally extinct 
The following species are locally extinct in the country:
Wild yak, Bos mutus (unclear if extant in Russia after 1500)
Dhole, Cuon alpinus
 Mediterranean monk seal, Monachus monachus

See also
List of chordate orders
Lists of mammals by region
List of prehistoric mammals
Mammal classification
List of mammals described in the 2000s

References

External links

 
Mammals
Russia
Russia
Russia